Ganesh Kumar Shanthakumar, known by his screen name Shivaganesh, is an Indian director and screenwriter who predominantly works in the Kannada film industry.

Career 
Ganesh Kumar Shanthakumar made his debut with Akhaada in 2010, which he introduced Vijay Sethupathi. Then he did a romantic film Hridayadalli Idhenidhu in the year 2010.

Filmography

References

External links

Living people